Lettie Annie Allen (3 October 1901 – 15 June 1980) was a New Zealand public servant, political activist, feminist and local politician. She was born in Wellington, New Zealand on 3 October 1901.

References

1901 births
1980 deaths
Wellington City Councillors
Wellington Hospital Board members
New Zealand feminists
New Zealand activists
New Zealand women activists
New Zealand public servants
20th-century New Zealand politicians
New Zealand Labour Party politicians